Caprino Bergamasco is a comune (municipality) in the Province of Bergamo in the Italian region of Lombardy, located about  northeast of Milan and about  northwest of Bergamo.

The municipality of Caprino Bergamasco contains the frazioni (subdivisions, mainly villages and hamlets) Sant'Antonio d'Adda, Celana, Opreno, Perlupario (casa di nico) Formorone and Ombria.

Caprino Bergamasco borders the following municipalities: Cisano Bergamasco, Palazzago, Pontida, Roncola, Torre de' Busi.

Demographic evolution

References

External links
 www.comune.caprinobergamasco.bg.it/